The 2015 Tendring District Council election took place on 7 May 2015 to elect members of Tendring District Council in England. This was on the same day as other local elections.

Candidates by party

Composition of Council

As of 7 April 2017, the Council Composition (following two by-elections) is:

24 Conservative  
22 UKIP  
5 Independent Group  
3 Holland-On-Sea Residents Association    
1 Lib Dem 
1 Tendring First .

The by-elections saw one UKIP GAIN from Conservative. The other a Conservative GAIN from UKIP.

After the election the composition of the council is:

Results Summary

Ward results

Alresford

Alton Park

Ardleigh and Little Bromley

Beaumont and Thorpe

Bockings Elm

Bradfield, Wrabness and Wix

Brightlingsea

Bursville

Frinton

Golf Green

Great and Little Oakley

Great Bentley

Hamford

Harwich East

Harwich East Central

Harwich West

Harwich West Central

Haven

Holland and Kirby

Homelands

Lawford

Little Clacton and Weeley

On 10 May 2015, UKIP's Jeff Bray resigned from the party and now sits as an independent.

Manningtree, Mistley, Little Bentley and Tendring

Peter Bruff

Pier

Ramsey and Parkeston

Rush Green

St. Bartholomews

St. James

St. Marys

St. Osyth and Point Clear

St. Pauls

Thorrington, Frating, Elmstead and Great Bromley

Walton

References

2015 English local elections
May 2015 events in the United Kingdom
2015
2010s in Essex